Lieutenant-Colonel John Pringle Appleby  (1892 – 29 March 1966) was the Postmaster General of Ceylon for seven years, between 1940 and 1947.

In 1907 he joined the Royal Mail, in 1921 made a supplementary clerk, and in 1933 was appointed the postmaster in Okehampton. Appleby served in the Royal Signal Corps during World War I and was appointed as a 2nd Lieutenant in 1917.

On 4 July 1936 Appleby was made a Justice of the Peace for the District of Colombo and on 1 October he was formally appointed as the Assistant Postmaster-General, replacing Gate Mudaliyar A. G. Tillekeratne. On several occasions he served as acting Postmaster General before being formally appointed to the position in early 1940. Between 1939 and 1946 the activities and advances in telecommunications were not given much publicity due to the war. It is known that in 1946 Appleby issued the first amateur radio transmitting licenses in the country.

In the 1945 New Year Honours list he was made a Companion of the Order of St Michael and St George for his services as Postmaster General. He retired from the Ceylon Civil Service in late 1946.

Appleby died on 29 March 1996 in Sidmouth, Devon.

References

External links
 
Sri Lanka Post

1892 births
1966 deaths
Postmasters General of Sri Lanka
British people in British Ceylon
Sri Lankan people of English descent
British Army personnel of World War I
Royal Corps of Signals officers